Strawberry generation (or ) is a Chinese-language neologism used in Taiwan for Taiwanese people born from 1990s onwards who "bruise easily" like strawberries – meaning they cannot withstand social pressure or work hard like their parents' generation; the term refers to people who are insubordinate, spoiled,  selfish, arrogant, and sluggish in work.

The term arises from the perception that members of this generation have grown up being overprotected by their parents and in an environment of stability, in a similar manner to how strawberries are grown in protected greenhouses and command a higher price compared to other fruits. The term gained prominence in the Taiwanese press, as it could be a way to designate a rising demographic or psychographic in terms of consumer behavior.

Ironic usage

In an ironic reference to the term, a 2008 student-led political movement in Taiwan started the Wild Strawberries Movement. This movement was in response to the visit of China's Association for Relations Across the Taiwan Strait (ARATS) chairman Chen Yunlin to the island. Police actions on protests aimed at Chen suppressed the display of Taiwan's national flag and the playing of Taiwanese songs. This prompted a group of 400 students in Taipei, Taiwan, to begin a sit-in in front of the Executive Yuan in protest of Taiwan's Parade and Assembly Law.

See also 
 9X Generation
 Buddha-like mindset
 Helicopter parent
 Hothousing
 Kiasi
 Kyoiku mama
 N-po generation
 Satori generation
 Snowflake (slang)
 Tang ping

References

External links

Chinese words and phrases
Cultural generations
Economy of Taiwan
Demographics of Taiwan
Neologisms
Taiwanese culture